Crawfish Lake is a small lake located  northeast of Omak, Washington. The northeast portion of the lake borders the Okanogan–Wenatchee National Forest, and the south half is on the Colville Indian Reservation. Most of the property along the shoreline of the lake is privately owned, with a US Forest Service campground occupying the northeast side of the lake. Motors have been prohibited on the lake since 1996. The lake is used mainly for fishing, rowing, canoeing, kayaking and swimming. The lake once contained many crawfish but the state has recently poisoned it to contain the native water reed and thus kill the crawfish.

External links
 Washington State Department of Ecology
 Washington Lakes

Crawfish
Okanogan National Forest
Lakes of Okanogan County, Washington